fTalega is the name of a tract housing project in the city of San Clemente in Orange County, California. It is a planned community, and began construction in 1999.

Geography
It is near the Northrop Grumman Capistrano Test Site (formerly TRW Inc.), where the lunar module descent engines were developed in the 1960s for the Apollo 11 moon landing.

Facilities
There is a shopping center which includes Ralphs, a Target, Barnoa Wine Company, Walmart, a golf course and one K-8 elementary school/middle school, named Vista Del Mar. It is served by the Capistrano Unified School District, and was recently annexed to San Clemente from the unincorporated territories it existed in upon the beginning of construction.

City maintained parks include Talega Park, Liberty Park, and Tierra Grande Park. Talega HOA maintained parks include Altea Park, Pacifica Summit Park, Portofino Park, Sansol/Mirador Park, and Lucia Park.

Neighborhoods
Talega is home to 9,000 residents and, when completed, will have a total of 3,500 residential units. Most are tract houses, with apartments, and condos all that share the same master pools and facilities. There are no full-custom homes. The community has a predominant Spanish-Tuscan architecture, which is carried out in almost every home, and all the public spaces and buildings within the community.

It consists of over 30 neighborhoods which are mostly single-family homes, some condominiums, and a few apartments. The major streets within the Talega Specific Plan are Avenida Pico, Camino La Pedriza, Avenida Vista Hermosa, and Avenida Talega.

In the southeastern part of Talega is an area called The Talega Gallery for residents over 55 years old.

History
In December 2007 the Southern California Multiple Listing Service moved Talega out of San Clemente and made it its own city. 

Due to its location in the hills, Talega faced several transportation issues. As of March 2009, there were only two main roads out of the community.  There was a proposed extension of La Pata that would bridge the 1.5-mile gap between Talega and the point where the road currently ends in San Juan Capistrano.  The Orange County Master Plan placed the location of this extension close to some homes in Talega.  A suggestion to relocate the route to a path halfway between Talega and the adjacent Forester Ranch community would have involved relocating power lines and would be the most expensive option.  Construction started in 2014, to be completed in fall of 2016.

References

External links 
 TalegaToday.com
 Talega Golf Club
 Talega Village Center
 http://dictionary.reverso.net/spanish-english/talega
 http://www.reviewjournal.com/columns-blogs/john-l-smith/it-takes-balls-name-your-housing-development-talega

Neighborhoods in San Clemente, California
Populated places established in 1999
1999 establishments in California